"Isn't This a Lovely Day?" is a popular song written by Irving Berlin for the 1935 film Top Hat, where it was introduced by Fred Astaire in the scene where his and Ginger Rogers' characters are caught in a gazebo during a rainstorm.
The lyric is an example of a song which turns a bad situation into a love song, a common style for Irving Berlin, as in I've Got My Love to Keep Me Warm and Let's Have Another Cup of Coffee.

Notable recordings
Fred Astaire recorded the song on three occasions. His 1935 version was assessed as reaching the No. 3 spot in the charts of the day. In 1953, he included the song in his album The Astaire Story. His final recording was in 1975 and the song was included in the album The Golden Age Of Fred Astaire.
Tony Bennett - Bennett/Berlin (1987)
Petula Clark - (1961)
Bing Crosby on the 1965 album Bing Crosby's Treasury - The Songs I Love
Ella Fitzgerald - Ella Fitzgerald Sings the Irving Berlin Songbook (1958)
Ella Fitzgerald and Louis Armstrong on the 1956 Verve release Ella and Louis
Dick Haymes - included in his 1957 album Moondreams.
Billie Holiday - recorded August 25, 1955
Stacey Kent - Let Yourself Go: Celebrating Fred Astaire (2000)
Diana Krall - From This Moment On (2006)
Seth MacFarlane - In Full Swing (2017)
Phil Ohman - his 1935 recording was assessed as reaching the No. 16 spot in the charts of the day.
Ginger Rogers (1935)
Helen Shapiro from her album Simply Shapiro (2000)
Jeri Southern - included in the album Southern Breeze (1958)
Sarah Vaughan and Billy Eckstine for their 1957 album Sarah Vaughan and Billy Eckstine Sing the Best of Irving Berlin.
George Shearing - Breakin' Out (1987)

References

Songs written by Irving Berlin
Fred Astaire songs
Songs written for films
Ella Fitzgerald songs
1935 songs
1935 singles